Under the Stars may refer to:
 Under the Stars (2001 film)
 Under the Stars (2007 film)
 Under the Stars (2020 film)
 Under the Stars (album), a 2016 album by ATB